Guendalina Buffon  (born ) is a retired Italian female volleyball player. She was part of the Italy women's national volleyball team.

She participated in the 1994 FIVB Volleyball Women's World Championship.

Personal life
Guendalina was born into a family of Italian athletes. Her mother, Maria Stella, was a discus thrower, and her father, Adriano, was a weightlifter. Following their athletic retirement, they subsequently worked as P.E. school teachers.

Guendalina's sister, Veronica, also played volleyball for the Italian national team; her brother, Gianluigi, is a professional football goalkeeper, who played for the Italy national football team.

References

1973 births
Living people
Italian women's volleyball players
People from Carrara
Sportspeople from the Province of Massa-Carrara
Guendalina